The Men's Discus Throw F42 had its Final held on September 16 at 9:30.

Medalists

Results

References
Final

Athletics at the 2008 Summer Paralympics